Alfred Schieske (6 September 1908 – 14 July 1970) was a German actor.

Career 
Schieske was born in Stuttgart, the son of a German father and a French mother. He studied acting with Willy Reichert made his stage debut at the Staatstheater Stuttgart at the age of 19. Afterward, he played in Heidelberg, Esslingen and Bochum. In 1940, he joined the Berlin Staatstheater, led by Gustaf Gründgens.

After World War II, Schieske first went to Cologne, then to Berlin in 1947, where he had an engagement at the Theater am Schiffbauerdamm, working there until 1950. He then worked at the Schiller and Schlosspark theaters in West Berlin, as well as in Düsseldorf, Recklinghausen and Jagsthausen. He also played guest roles at other theaters. In 1950 he played the role of camp commandant of Ravensbrück in the British film Odette.

Among the stage roles played by Schieske were Milota in König Ottokars Glück und Ende, Klesel in Ein Bruderzwist in Habsburg, Oberst Henry in Wilhelm Herzog's play about the Dreyfus Affair and Phil Cook in The Country Girl by Clifford Odets. He played several roles in German productions of Shakespeare; Bolingbroke in Richard II, Clarence in Richard III and Sir Toby Belch (German: Tobias Rülps) in Twelfth Night. He played Vladimir in Waiting for Godot, Adam in The Broken Jug, Götz in Götz von Berlichingen and Big Daddy in Cat on a Hot Tin Roof. In 1961, in one of his most successful roles, he began playing Alfred P. Doolittle (Eliza's father) in the musical My Fair Lady, first in Berlin, then Hamburg.

Schieske's most important film role was in the 1948 DEFA production, the Blum Affair, playing Otto Bonte, a criminal investigator who saves a Jewish man falsely accused of a crime, saves him and brings the real culprit to justice. In the 1960s, he acted on television in adaptations of literary works, such as Wer einmal aus dem Blechnapf frißt and Jeder stirbt für sich allein with Edith Schultze-Westrum and Anneli Granget, based on Hans Fallada's novel, Every Man Dies Alone.

Schieske's son, Geriet Schieske (b. 1945), is also an actor.

Filmography 

 Friedemann Bach (1941) - Wirt in Braunschweig (uncredited)
  (1941) - Kriegsrat
 Back Then (1943) - Bassist
 Meine vier Jungens (1944) - Fritz Martens - Werkmeister
 Der Puppenspieler (1945) - Jochen Henke
 Die Schenke zur ewigen Liebe (1945) - Hauer Fritz
 Affaire Blum (1948) - Kriminalkommissar Otto Bonte
 Berliner Ballade (1948) - Herr Schneidewind, Politischer Redner
 Quartet of Five (1949) - Professor Mangold
 The Beaver Coat (1949) - Wulkow
 Odette (1950) - Camp Commandant
 A Day Will Come (1950) - Oberst Schedy
 The Guilt of Doctor Homma (1951)
 Big City Secret (1952)
 Inspektor Tondi (1952, TV Short) - Inspektor Tondi
 The Merry Vineyard (1952) - Dr. Unkelhäuser (uncredited)
 Children, Mother, and the General (1955) - Fahrer mit der Flasche
 The Plot to Assassinate Hitler (1955) - Fahrer mit der Flasche
 Night of Decision (1956) - André
 Dorothea Angermann (1959) - Pastor Angermann
 Der Fehltritt (1960, TV Movie) - Barossy
 Jenseits des Rheins (1960) - Fritz Keßler
 Wer einmal aus dem Blechnapf frißt (1961, TV Mini-Series) - Hauptwachtmeister Rusch
 Jeder stirbt für sich allein (1962, TV Movie) - Otto Quangel
 Das Leben ein Traum (1963, TV Movie) - Rosauras Diener
 Überstunden (1965, TV Movie) - Opa
 Romulus der Große (1965, TV Movie) - Cäsar Rupf
 Das Kriminalmuseum (1965, TV Series) - Kriminalkommissar Huberty
 Der Richter von London (1966, TV Movie) - Simon Eyre
 Kollege Crampton (1967, TV Movie) - Professor Crampton
 Wo liegt Jena? (1967, TV Movie) - Probst
 Flachsmann als Erzieher (1968, TV Movie) - Dr. Prell
 From Mice and Men (1968, TV Movie) - Chef
 Die Wilde (1968, TV Movie) - Monsieur Tarde
 Bitte recht freundlich, es wird geschossen (1969, TV Series) - Joe Baxter
 Zehn kleine Negerlein (1969, TV Movie) - Sir Lawrence Wargrave
 Michael Kohlhaas (1969)
 Pippi in the South Seas (1970) - Innkeeper
 Under the Roofs of St. Pauli (1970) - Egon Mills
 Peenemünde (1970, TV Movie) - Winston Churchill
 Das Feuerwerk (1971, TV Movie) - Vater

References

External links 
 
 

1908 births
1970 deaths
Male actors from Stuttgart
German male television actors
German male stage actors
German male film actors
German people of French descent
20th-century German male actors